Aburi is a village in Väike-Maarja Parish, Lääne-Viru County, in northeastern Estonia.

Notable people
Juhan Ross (1925-) -physicist

References

Villages in Lääne-Viru County